Michael Radau (1617-1687) was a Prussian priest, Jesuit and theologian. He was a professor of rhetoric in the Braniewo collegium around 1641. Later he resided in Königsberg (around 1654 to 1675).

Works 
He is known for his Orator extemporeneus (1672).

References

1617 births
1687 deaths
17th-century German Jesuits
German male writers
Clergy from Königsberg